Aki Kondo (born February 22, 1977) is a Japanese illustrator and character designer, and former staff of San-X.

Biography 
After graduating from the Junior College of Art and Design at Joshibi University of Art and Design, Kondo was hired to work in the Design studio of San-X in 1997.

Kondo created and produced "Amaguri Chan" (September 2002), "Mikan Bouya" (December 2002) and Rilakkuma (September 2003) while she was at San-X. Kondo left San-X in 2003, and became a freelance illustrator and designer. In 2005, Kondo has released the first Manga Comic "Okutan & Danna chan".

Kondo is married to illustrator Tarouichi Aizawa and they have two daughters. Kondo is a part-time lecturer in Art and Design for Healing at Joshibi University of Art and Design.

Works 
 Amaguri Chan
 Mikan Bouya
 Okutan & Danna chan
 Usagi no Mofy
 moguppy
 Chopin & Pansy
 Wonderful Family
 PLATINUM BOYS
 NyaOssan

External links 
Aki Kondo Official Website

Japanese graphic designers
Manga artists
People from Matsuyama, Ehime
1977 births
Living people